Telephone Exchange Building may refer to:

Telephone Exchange Building (Powhatan, Arkansas), listed on the National Register of Historic Places in Lawrence County, Arkansas
Telephone Exchange Building (Norwich, Connecticut), listed on the National Register of Historic Places in New London County, Connecticut

See also
List of telephone company buildings
Telephone Company Building (disambiguation)